The Independence Tribunal of Diyarbakır is a court established in March 1925 in order to quell the Sheikh Said rebellion. The law was to be valid for two years, after which the Independence Tribunal of Diyarbkır was disestablished.

History 
All of these men took part in the movement of the Young Turks. After eight months,  succeeded Kansu as its president. The last president was Ali Saip, and for him Ibrahim Kocaeli was seated as a member of the tribunal. The tribunal first took aim at the Kurdish elite residing in Istanbul, notably former members of the Society of the Advancement of Kurdistan (SAK) and sentenced them to death. The former leaders of the SAK, Sayyid Abdulkadir and his son Sayyid Mehmed (both descendants of Sheikh Ubeydullah), Fuad Berxo, and the journalist Hizanizâde Kemal Fevzi were hanged on the 27 May 1925 in sight of the Ulu Cami of Diyarbakır. Following, many of the Kurdish elite in the eastern provinces were prosecuted and hanged. Sheikh Said was arrested in April 1925 and following sent to the Diyarbakir prison. On 28 June 1925, Sheikh Said was tried and given the death sentence together with 46 of his followers. The next day they were hanged at the Mountain Gate of Diyarbakir. In total, the Independence Tribunal in Diyarbakır prosecuted more than 5000, found over 2700 as not guilty and sentenced 420 to death. The rulings of the Independence Tribunal were final and not appealable.

References 

Courts in Turkey
History of Turkey
History of Kurdistan